Kuzkin is a rural locality (a selo) in Kalachyovskoye Rural Settlement, Kikvidzensky District, Volgograd Oblast, Russia. The population was 110 as of 2010. There are 2 streets.

Geography 
Kuzkin is located 21 km southwest of Preobrazhenskaya (the district's administrative centre) by road. Lestyukhin is the nearest rural locality.

References 

Rural localities in Kikvidzensky District